The Comedy Channel was an Australian television channel from 1996 to 2020.

The Comedy Channel may also refer to:

The Comedy Channel (American TV channel), 1989–1991; merged with HA! to become Comedy Central
The Comedy Channel (British TV channel), 1991–1992

See also 
CTV Comedy Channel, a Canadian television channel